Ibrahimpatnam (known locally as IBM) is a part of Vijayawada in NTR district of the Indian state of Andhra Pradesh. It is also the mandal headquarters of Ibrahimpatnam mandal. The Dr Narla Tata Rao Thermal Power Station, one of the major thermal power stations of the state, is located near the town. The Railway Wagon Workshop at Rayanapadu is also located very near to Ibrahimpatnam at a distance of 4 km.

Demographics 
At the 2011 census, the village had a population of 29,432 (13,690 males and 15,742 females: a sex ratio of 1,150 females per 1,000 males). 3,052 children were in the age group of 0–6 years (1,514 are boys and 1,538 are girls;  ratio of 1,016 per 1,000). The average literacy rate was 78.37% with 20,673 literates, significantly higher than the state average of 67.41%.

Transport 

It is under the administration of the Vijayawada railway division of South Central Railway zone. NH 65 passes through the town, which connects Vijayawada and Hyderabad. APSRTC operates city buses from Vijayawada to Ibrahimpatnam.

Education
Primary and secondary school education are provideded by government, aided and private schools, under the School Education Department of the state. The medium of instruction in schools is English and Telugu.

See also 
List of census towns in Andhra Pradesh

References 

Neighbourhoods in Vijayawada
Mandal headquarters in NTR district